Cudd is a surname.  Notable people with the surname include:

 Ann Cudd, American college dean and administrator
 J.W. Cudd, American singer and actor 
 Nic Cudd (born 1988), Welsh rugby union footballer
 Herschel H. Cudd (1912–1992), American businessman and CEO